Aaviku is a village in Rae Parish, Harju County, in northern Estonia. It has a population of 194 (as of 1 January 2010).

Population

Source for the diagram:

References

Villages in Harju County
Articles which contain graphical timelines